Adult Swim (AS; stylized as [adult swim] since 2003 and often abbreviated as [as]) is a prime time and late night programming block broadcast by the American basic cable channel Cartoon Network. The block features stylistically varied animated and live-action series targeting a young adult audience, including original programming (particularly comedies), syndicated series, and short films with generally minimal or no editing for content. Adult Swim is programmed by Williams Street, a subsidiary of Warner Bros. Television Studios that also produces much of the block's original programming. 

First broadcast on September 2, 2001, Adult Swim has frequently aired adult animation features, mockumentaries, sketch comedy, and pilots. Its programs are known for their sexual themes, strong language, and graphic violence. Many of its programs are aesthetically experimental, transgressive, improvised, and surrealist in nature. Adult Swim has contracted with various studios known for their productions in absurd and shock comedy. The block has also acquired reruns of animated sitcoms.

Adult Swim is sometimes promoted by Warner Bros. Discovery U.S. Networks as being a separate channel timesharing with Cartoon Network in its channel allotments. Due to its different demographics, Adult Swim's viewership has been measured separately from Cartoon Network in Nielsen ratings reports since 2005.

History

Creation and development (1994–2001) 

Cartoon Network's original head programmer, Mike Lazzo, conceived Adult Swim. The block grew out of Cartoon Network's previous attempts at airing content appropriate for teenagers and young adults who might be watching the channel after 11 pm (ET/PT). The network began experimenting with its late night programming by airing anthology shows that presented uncensored classic cartoon shorts, such as ToonHeads, The Bob Clampett Show, The Tex Avery Show, Late Night Black and White, and O Canada. Another block, Toonami's "Midnight Run", aired the network's action programming uncut with minimal edits. At that time, one third of Cartoon Network's audience were adults.

During the 1990s, prime time animation geared toward adults started growing popular due to the success of Fox's hit show The Simpsons. This was followed by a trend of other adult-oriented animated shows throughout the decade, as well as more general-oriented animated series that garnered strong adult followings.

Space Ghost Coast to Coast, Cartoon Network's first foray into original programming, was created in 1994 specifically for late-night adult audiences. The series was created by Mike Lazzo's Ghost Planet Industries, which eventually became Williams Street Studios, the producers and programmers of Adult Swim.

Between 4:00 am and 5:00 am on December 21, and December 30, 2000 (while Space Ghost Coast to Coast was on hiatus), several new Williams Street series made unannounced "stealth" premieres. Sealab 2021, Harvey Birdman, Attorney at Law, Aqua Teen Hunger Force, and The Brak Show all premiered unannounced; the official schedules listed the shows as "Special Programming". Prior to that, in Entertainment Weekly, it was stated that Michael Ouweleen's next project was working on the Harvey Birdman, Attorney at Law Pilot with J. J. Sedelmaier. In a 1999 interview, the indie pop rock band Calamine stated they had recorded the theme song for Sealab 2021. While entertaining pitches for a variety of adult cartoons, Lazzo realized the potential for packaging them as a complete adult-focused block. Different names were considered, including "ibiso", which was said to be Spanish for "stop", and "Parental Warning", "Parental Block" but he eventually settled on "Adult Swim".

Cartoon Network originally intended to launch the adult animation block on April 1, 2001, but was delayed five months. In June 2001, TV Guide had recorded an interview with Cartoon Network's former president, Betty Cohen. She stated there was a new programming block coming out in September that was aimed for an adult audience. During this month at the Cartoon Network Confidential, "Cartoon Network's best originals and outrageous animated shorts for discriminating adults" in New York City, an upcoming episode of Space Ghost Coast to Coast titled "Kentucky Nightmare", the stealth pilots from December, Captain Linger, and an episode of Home Movies were screened for free. The screening was part of the Toyota Comedy Festival. On Saturday, July 21, 2001, the Space Ghost Coast to Coast panel at San Diego Comic Con had a trivia game in which the winners won a promotional CD that had the theme songs to the upcoming Adult Swim Shows. Everybody who attended got a free Adult Swim t-shirt that was packaged to look like a roll of bandages that a lifeguard might carry.

At the Comic Con, audiences got to see clips of the upcoming shows and vote for what show they wanted to see as a sneak peek. Harvey Birdman, Attorney at Law was the winner and the pilot was screened. The Leave It to Brak episode "Mr. Bawk Ba Gawk" and Space Ghost Coast to Coast episode "The Justice Hole" were also screened, as well as clips to the episode "Sweet for Brak". In an interview on creativemac.com on July 25, 2001, J. J. Sedelmaier talked about working on the Harvey Birdman, Attorney at Law pilot. On August 12, the first commercial advertising the new block aired on Cartoon Network. Around this time a press kit came out that featured towels and a promotional CD. Another press kit that was designed as a first aid kit came with a promo VHS with info on all the shows. Access Hollywood also highlighted the upcoming premieres. Print ads were shown in an August issue of Entertainment Weekly. On August 31, adultswim.com officially launched.

2001–2003 

Adult Swim officially launched on September 2, 2001, at 10p.m. ET, with the original debut airing of the Home Movies episode "Director's Cut", which had been shelved before airing on its original network, UPN. According to Linda Simensky, "We had a bunch of episodes to screen for Mike Lazzo and by only the second episode, he yelled, "Buy it!" Cartoon Network bought the original five UPN episodes and ordered eight more to complete the season. The series' first season was animated in Squigglevision; later seasons were done in flash animation. The first anime broadcast on the block also aired on the night of its launch, Cowboy Bebop. Aqua Teen Hunger Force debuted on the block on September 9, with the episode "Escape from Leprechaupolis". The block initially aired on Sunday nights from 10:00 pm to 1:00 am ET, with a repeat of the same block on Thursday nights.

Adult Swim's original bumpers shown in-between the shows featured footage of elderly people swimming in public pools, eating, exercising, and doing other pool-related activities. It would show signs all around the pool saying things like "Warning Potential Violence", "Warning Strong Language in use", "Caution Sexual Innuendo", "Caution Limited Animation", "No Diving", "No Kids", "Warning Adult Situations", and more. Some of these bumpers were narrated by a lifeguard who spoke through a megaphone. Most notably he would shout "All kids out of the pool". The logo was the words "Adult Swim" in all capital letters (or often an alternate version of the logo featured the block's name rendered in red and a black circle with a yellow penumbra, which also used as the main logo from 2002 to 2003), shown after a freeze frame of the footage. Sometimes they were even shown in reverse. The block's original theme music, titled "D-Code," was a remix of "Mambo Gallego" done by the Melbourne musician Dust Devil, originally played by Latin jazz musician Tito Puente, Sr.

Some of the bumps on the block included Aquaman Dance Party that featured a cartoon Aquaman dancing in front of live action landfill footage, Captain Linger, a series of shorts created by J. J. Sedelmaier, Watering Hole, a series of shorts about animals talking in a bar created by Soup2Nuts, 1960s Hanna-Barbera action cartoons dubbed with the voices of children, a series of shorts called Not for Air that had the speech of Hanna-Barbera characters bleeped to make it seem like the characters were swearing, The New Adventures of The Wonder Twins, What They're Really Thinking, which had a voice narrate a character's thoughts in a comedic way, and Brak Puppet Party, a puppet show featuring classic Hanna-Barbera characters.

Commercials starring characters from Aqua Teen Hunger Force, The Brak Show, Space Ghost Coast to Coast, Harvey Birdman, Attorney At Law, and Sealab 2021 started to appear as well, such as 1-800-CALL-ATT, Nestea, Dr Pepper, Coca-Cola, Dodge Ram, Quizno's Sub, Maximum Hair Dye, Verizon Wireless, and movie promos for Austin Powers in Goldmember, Kung Pow Enter the Fist, Jackass: The Movie, Eight Legged Freaks, and The Powerpuff Girls Movie. Brak would also host a segment called Adult Swim News. Due to the September 11, 2001 terrorist attacks, episodes of Harvey Birdman, Attorney at Law, Cowboy Bebop, and Aqua Teen Hunger Force were delayed. In the winter of 2001 another Adult Swim CD was made available for free to anyone who purchased issue 28 of Hitch Magazine and the same CD came with issue 29.

When the Saturday night block debuted on February 23, 2002, it was known as Adult Swim Action, with various anime programs displayed on the block from 11:00 pm to 2:00 am ET. Thus, programming on the block was divided between Adult Swim Action and Adult Swim Comedy. Adult Swim Comedy was Sunday nights and ran from 10:00 pm to 1:00 am ET. Two days prior, on February 21, Adult Swim stopped airing on Thursday nights. The Rocky and Bullwinkle Show and The Popeye Show took Cowboy Bebops place for 12:00 am and 12:30 am ET. On June 15, 2002, Adult Swim had their first contest called "Adult Swim Happiness Sweepstakes" where winners could win a Master Shake air freshener.

It became increasingly common for Adult Swim to act as a home for reruns of animated series that had been canceled prematurely, such as Home Movies, Baby Blues, Mission Hill, The Oblongs, The Ripping Friends, Futurama, Family Guy, and God, the Devil and Bob, as well as burn off remaining episodes of said shows that never aired on their original networks, as a result of their premature cancellation. The block obtained Futurama'''s exclusive pay-TV syndication rights in September 2002 for a reported $10 million, and the series first aired on the network on January 12, 2003.Archived at Ghostarchive and the Wayback Machine:  Family Guy made its debut on April 20 of that year with the episode "Brian in Love", and immediately became the block's top-rated program, dominating late night viewing in its time period vs. pay-television and free-to-air competition and boosting viewership of both the block, and Cartoon Network itself, by 239 percent. (Seth MacFarlane had previously created Larry and Steve, a cartoon predecessor to Family Guy, that was aired on Cartoon Network's What a Cartoon! Show in 1997. MacFarlane had also worked on several Cartoon Network shows, such as Johnny Bravo and Dexter's Laboratory).

On New Year's Eve 2002, Brak from The Brak Show and Carl Brutananadilewski from Aqua Teen Hunger Force hosted a New Year's Eve special from 11:00 pm to 3:00 am.Archived at Ghostarchive and the Wayback Machine:  This was the first time Adult Swim aired on a Tuesday night.

Beginning on January 13, 2003, Adult Swim was airing five nights a week, Sundays through Thursdays from 11:00 pm to 2:00 am. Saturday Nights were dropped. On February 9, 2003, after the NBA All-Star game, Adult Swim aired on TNT on a block called "Adult Swim All Star Extravaganza" as a one time special from 11:00 pm to 12:15 am ET.

 2003–2014 

On October 5, 2003, Adult Swim was on from 11:00 pm to 2:00 am ET. On October 26, 2003, Brak's Dad from The Brak Show hosted Halloween-themed bumps. That same night, Adult Swim hosted a live webcam show on its website, featuring the Adult Swim staff having a party. The Big O series finale episode "The Show Must Go On", was supposed to premiere that night at 11:00pm; however, Adult Swim had to reschedule the episode for the next week, on Sunday, November 2, taking the place of the scheduled previously unaired episode of Family Guy, "When You Wish Upon a Weinstein", to air on November 9. When Big O premiered on November 2, a rerun episode, "Stripes" was airing but then Adult Swim said it was just a joke and they finally aired the correct episode.

Adult Swim had another New Year's Eve special, this time featuring some of the Adult Swim characters having a party at Brak's house celebrating New Year's Eve. It was on this night where The Brak Show was officially canceled. On June 15, 2004, Adult Swim launched a Video on Demand. On July 19, 2004, Adult Swim had a publicity stunt telling viewers that they needed 1,000,000 people to go to their website so they could "Free Hockey Chicken". An employee was dressed as a chicken in front of a webcam being watched by viewers, and he could not leave the studio until they reached their goal. That same year Adult Swim hyped viewers by asking them to vote which would win in a fight: a "Flying Shark or a Flying Crocodile".

In the fall of 2004, Adult Swim started a course at Kent State University with lessons by film professor Ron Russo, author of the book "Adult Swim and Comedy". On Halloween night in 2004, Phantasm actor Angus Scrimm hosted an Aqua Teen Hunger Force marathon. On November 2, 2004, Adult Swim ran a marathon of the Harvey Birdman, Attorney at Law episode "Guitar Control" all through the night, until 2a.m.. The episode replayed 24 times to celebrate Election Day. On November 28, Adult Swim had a week showing off classic bumps from previous years. On March 28, 2005, Atlanta-based Turner Broadcasting System began recording Adult Swim Nielsen ratings separately from Cartoon Network for demographic purposes. Promotions for Adult Swim are targeted towards the college age and those in their 20s and 30s, constituting the majority of their viewers. According to a September 1, 2004, article in Promo magazine, representatives travel to 30 universities across the U.S. to promote the Adult Swim lineup, including handing out posters for students' dorm rooms. On April 17, 2004, Adult Swim regained Saturday nights, making Friday the only night where Adult Swim did not air. On March 28, 2005, Adult Swim gained an extra hour, now ending at 6 a.m.. On October 2, 2005, Adult Swim regained the 10 p.m. hour on Sundays, continuing to start at 11 p.m. Mondays to Thursdays, and Saturdays.

Adult Swim had a direct and important role in the revival of an aforementioned popular animated series, Family Guy. Due to the series' popularity in reruns, the block burned off "When You Wish Upon a Weinstein", an episode of the series that had been banned from airing on Fox, in 2003. On September 21, 2003, Seth MacFarlane guest voiced on the Aqua Teen Hunger Force episode "Super Trivia". In 2004, from July 26 through July 29 Adult Swim had a week dedicated to Seth MacFarlane where it had him host a Family Guy marathon showing select episodes. On March 29, 2004, less than one year after beginning reruns on Adult Swim, Fox announced it would be renewing Family Guy for a fourth season and reviving it from cancellation. Shortly after the announcement, Jim Samples, then-general manager and executive vice president of Cartoon Network, commented, "Bringing Family Guy to the Adult Swim lineup last April really helped turn the block into a cultural phenomenon with young adults."Futurama was also revived in 2007 by Comedy Central for similar reasons: impressive viewership in syndication as well as high DVD sales. In 2006, 20th Century Fox struck a deal to produce four direct-to-video animated features based on Futurama, and, in 2009, the series was revived in normal half-hour installments beginning in 2010 on Comedy Central. In a 2006 interview, Futurama creator Matt Groening explained "There's a long, regal history of misunderstood TV shows, and to Fox's credit, the studio looked at the ratings on the Cartoon Network and how the show does overseas, and saw that there was more money to be made." Before Adult Swim lost the rights to Futurama reruns, they aired an all-night marathon from December 26–30, 2007, with the final reruns airing on December 31, thus, marking Futurama's last airing on the block until 2021. On New Year's Eve 2005, Adult Swim had a countdown for the new year featuring characters from their shows. Beginning on March 27, 2006, Adult Swim's time began at 10:30 pm ET weekdays.

On January 31, 2007, Adult Swim attracted national media attention as part of the 2007 Boston Mooninite panic. Both the Boston Police Department and the Boston Fire Department mistakenly identified battery-powered LED placards resembling The Mooninites, characters from Aqua Teen Hunger Force, as improvised explosive devices. These devices were in fact part of a guerrilla marketing campaign for the Aqua Teen Hunger Force Colon Movie Film for Theaters. The next day, Boston authorities arrested two men involved with the incident. Peter Berdovsky, 27, a freelance video artist from Arlington, Massachusetts, and Sean Stevens, 28, were facing charges of placing a hoax device to incite panic, as well as one count of disorderly conduct, according to CNN (which is also owned by Turner Broadcasting System).

On February 5, Turner Broadcasting and marketer Interference, Inc. announced that they would pay $2 million in amends: one million to the city of Boston, and one million in goodwill funds. Four days later, on February 9, Jim Samples, general manager and Executive Vice President of Cartoon Network since 2001, resigned. Turner Broadcasting later issued an apology for the ad campaign that caused the bomb scares. A statement emailed to The Boston Globe from Turner Broadcasting said:

"The 'packages' in question are magnetic lights that pose no danger. They are part of an outdoor marketing campaign in 10 cities in support of Adult Swim's animated television show Aqua Teen Hunger Force. They had been in place for two to three weeks in Boston, New York City, Los Angeles, Chicago, Houston, Atlanta, Seattle, Portland, Austin, San Francisco, and Philadelphia. Parent company Turner Broadcasting is in contact with local and federal law enforcement on the exact locations of the billboards. We regret that they were mistakenly thought to pose any danger."

In 2007, Adult Swim announced it would expand to seven nights a week starting that July. Up until then, it was only on Saturdays-Thursdays, with Cartoon Network airing 24 hours on Friday. On July 6 of that year, Adult Swim had its first broadcast on a Friday with an all-night marathon of Family Guy, with one episode, Peter's Two Dads, rerunning the April Fools gag of that year, running the first half-hour of Aqua Teen Hunger Force Colon Movie Film For Theaters in a small square on the bottom left hand corner.

In October 2007, Adult Swim launched a video on demand service available on DirecTV channel 1886.

On January 1, 2009, Adult Swim began airing reruns of King of the Hill and its sign-on time was expanded back from 11 p.m. to 10 p.m. ET. On December 27, 2010, Adult Swim moved its start time from 10 p.m. to 9 p.m. ET, extending the network's daily schedule to nine hours.

On April 1, 2012, as part of their annual April Fools' Day stunt, Adult Swim revived Toonami, the defunct Cartoon Network programming block that primarily aired anime and action cartoons. Following positive reception, Toonami would return full-time as a rebrand of Adult Swim's Saturday night action block on May 26, 2012.

 2014–2019 

On March 31, 2014, Adult Swim's start time moved up to 8:00 p.m. ET, further extending its nightly schedule to ten hours (and effectively matching the airtime of most nights that Nick at Nite has). Cartoon Network still airs programming in the 8:00 p.m. ET hour on occasion, primarily in the months leading up to Christmas.

In 2015, Adult Swim launched The Virtual Brainload, the first animated VR experience from a TV network.

On May 7, 2015, it was announced that Adult Swim had ordered an untitled pilot by Million Dollar Extreme described as a "sketch show in an almost present day post apocalyptic nightmare world". Based on that pilot, it was announced on March 3, 2016, that it would go to series with the group presenting it under the additional subtitle World Peace, and the first season consisting of six episodes under Adult Swim's traditional eleven-minute episode structure. Adult Swim announced on December 5, 2016, that it would not be renewed for a second season; Adult Swim faced internal opposition to its continuation, mainly regarding accusations of MDE's documented connections to the alt-right and accusations that the show promoted racism, sexism and bigotry. While the show did not predominantly deal with political themes, Sam Hyde's Twitter feed containing political references and his other controversies like crashing a TEDx talk, added to the suspicion. Buzzfeed writer, Joseph Bernstein, was active in criticizing the show after a heated interview with creator Sam Hyde. He wrote that a source told him the Adult Swim's standards departments repeatedly discovered and removed coded racist messages, including hidden swastikas. When asked, Hyde explained that despite Adult Swim executives' interest to pick up the show for a second season, Turner Broadcasting ultimately decided to cancel the show.

On September 28, 2017, Pete Smith, a long-time producer at the studio and co-creator of The Brak Show, retired from the company. On that night, Adult Swim celebrated his career with an all-night marathon of just Bob's Burgers (consisting of episodes that his daughter, Nora Smith, wrote) and The Brak Show, with promos and bumpers made by Pete Smith airing during breaks. This became an annual event, with each following event also consisting of a 10 hour marathon of both shows until 2021, when there was only a two hour marathon of The Brak Show. The following events also added newly produced shorts and interstitials from Cartoon Planet, which Pete wrote for.

Adult Swim began losing the syndication rights to various 20th Television animated series in 2018; Comedy Central acquired the syndication rights to King of the Hill and The Cleveland Show that year. On April 8, 2019, it was announced that FXX would acquire the rights to season 16 and beyond of Family Guy (sharing those rights with sister networks Freeform and FX) and season 9 and beyond of Bob's Burgers, with rights to the seasons currently airing on Adult Swim and sister network TBS set to transfer over to the Disney-owned networks. Family Guy was the first to leave on September 18, 2021, with Bob's Burgers to follow in 2023. American Dad!, which has been a TBS original series since 2014, is set to remain.

On March 4, 2019, AT&T announced a major reorganization of WarnerMedia's Turner Broadcasting division, which involves Cartoon Network, Adult Swim, Boomerang, and Turner Classic Movies being transferred to Warner Bros. Entertainment under a new Kids, Young Adults, and Classics division. Although AT&T did not specify any timetable for the changes to take effect, WarnerMedia had begun to remove all Turner references in corporate communications and press releases, referring to that unit's networks as "divisions of WarnerMedia".

 2019–present 
In December 2019, Mike Lazzo retired from the company, which was announced by a bumper that aired on Adult Swim that month. On April 29, 2020, Michael Ouweleen, previously the chief marketing officer of Cartoon Network, Adult Swim, and Boomerang and the co-creator of Harvey Birdman: Attorney at Law, was named the President of Adult Swim, a new position that gives Ouweleen responsibility for all aspects of Adult Swim and its properties. Adult Swim faced layoffs in November 2020, resulting in the closing of Pocket Mortys developer Big Pixel Studios and the cancellation of all of Adult Swim's online live stream series. Keith Crofford retired from the company in December 2020, which was celebrated with two bumpers featuring Meatwad from Aqua Teen Hunger Force and Seth Green and Matthew Senreich from Robot Chicken.

On April 23, 2021, WarnerMedia announced that Adult Swim would merge with HBO Max's adult animation development teams, under the leadership of Suzanna Makkos.Family Guy left Adult Swim on September 18, 2021, after an 18-year long run. The block noted the occasion with a special bumper featuring various Adult Swim characters waving goodbye to the Griffin family. The network then reacquired the rights to King of the Hill and Futurama on November 22, 2021, and December 27, 2021, respectively. From October 18, 2021, onward, Adult Swim began airing certain programs in a compressed format, speeding up programs to accommodate additional time slots for advertising sales and airing credits in a split-screen format, similar to sister network TBS.

In May 2022, following WarnerMedia's merger with Discovery Inc. to form Warner Bros. Discovery, the Warner Bros. Global Kids, Young Adults, and Classics division was dissolved. Adult Swim was moved under the Warner Bros. Discovery U.S. Networks Group, while Williams Street moved under Warner Bros. Television. Michael Ouweleen still oversees both units, while also gaining oversight to Cartoon Network, Boomerang, and Discovery Family. Several Adult Swim shows, including Blade Runner: Black Lotus, Tigtone, and Lazor Wulf, were removed from Adult Swim's website and HBO Max that year as a part of massive cost-cutting moves at Warner Bros. Discovery. Some other series, like Final Space, were written off as a loss for tax purposes and removed from digital stores. On January 24, 2023, it was announced that Adult Swim had severed ties with Rick and Morty co-creator Justin Roiland after he was charged with felony domestic abuse.

 Special events 
 Death tributes 
Adult Swim occasionally airs bumpers that pay tribute to a recent celebrity death. These bumpers have no music or sound effects, but only a fade-in, showing the person's name, year of birth, and year of death, followed by a fade-out. This has been done for many people over the years, including celebrities such as Steve Jobs, Kobe Bryant, and MF Doom, and Adult Swim cast and crew such as Harry Goz. Some tribute bumpers have been made jokingly, such as one mocking the declining quality of Game of Thrones in 2017 and one marking the lifespan of NFTs as 2021 - 2021.

Following the death of Space Ghost Coast to Coast animator and voice actor C. Martin Croker on September 17, 2016, Adult Swim paid tribute to him the following night, playing the first produced episode of the show ("Elevator") with tribute bumpers bookending the rerun. Toonami also paid tribute to Croker the following Saturday, with T.O.M. and S.A.R.A. saying farewell to former host Moltar (voiced by Croker) in a special intro.

Following the death of Norm Macdonald on September 14, 2021, Adult Swim aired an hour of Mike Tyson Mysteries, where he played Pigeon, on the 14th and the 15th.

 April Fools' Day stunts 
Adult Swim has an annual tradition of celebrating April Fools' Day by tricking and fooling their audience by altering programs or airing different and obscure programs. The pranks generally start at 12 a.m. ET on April 1, technically considered part of the March 31 schedule, with an additional prank on the April 1 schedule rarely.

 Starting in 2004, all of the regularly scheduled episodes were aired with random mustaches drawn on the characters; however, the next night the episodes were aired again this time without the random mustaches.
 In 2005, Adult Swim aired an early, unfinished version of the Squidbillies pilot, instead of Robot Chicken. Right after the rough cut, it was announced that the animated series would premiere later in October 2005.
 In 2006, Adult Swim aired old re-runs of Mr. T and Karate Kommandos, and then aired episodes of Fullmetal Alchemist and Ghost in the Shell: Stand Alone Complex with fart noises added to the dialog.
 On March 31, 2007, Adult Swim aired every episode of Perfect Hair Forever in reverse order. The episodes were digitally degraded to look like several generations-old videotapes with grammatically incorrect subtitles in Engrish. At one point, the subtitles shown on screen were actually for an Aqua Teen Hunger Force episode.
 On April 1, 2007, Adult Swim had been advertising that it would be airing Aqua Teen Hunger Force Colon Movie Film for Theaters in its entirety on April Fools' Day. Technically, they made good on their promise by showing the first two minutes (which had long been available on the movie's website) full-screen and the entire rest of the film in a very small picture-in-picture window with its sound played over SAP during normal programming.
 In 2008, Adult Swim aired a night of unfinished sneak peeks, pilots and stealth premieres of future upcoming shows in place of its regularly scheduled programming, featuring Fat Guy Stuck in Internet, The Venture Bros., Delocated, Superjail!, Young Person's Guide to History, Metalocalypse, Robot Chicken, and Moral Orel. Some of these premieres included introductory segments hosted by Robert Osborne from Turner Classic Movies. The repeat block did air the scheduled ATHF movie, with bumps teasing the viewer about missing the premieres.
 In 2009, Adult Swim aired The Room, a critically panned 2003 independent film that was considered a cult classic, with sex scenes obscured with black boxes. That was followed by the Tim and Eric Awesome Show, Great Job! episode "Tommy", which featured the star and director of the film Tommy Wiseau.
 In 2010, Adult Swim re-aired The Room for a second year in a row, with bumps featuring Tommy Wiseau being interviewed on Space Ghost Coast to Coast. Sex scenes remained censored, but the parental rating was raised to TV-MA.
 In 2011, The Room was aired once again with the TV-MA rating and was followed by a 15-minute special titled Earth Ghost, a CGI version of the Lowe Country pilot shown on Adult Swim's website in 2007.
 In 2012, Adult Swim replaced its lineup with Toonami, a former programming block from Cartoon Network. After first playing the opening sequence of The Room, the scene switched to the Toonami host T.O.M. noting that it was April Fools' Day before introducing that week's scheduled episode of Bleach. The Toonami bumps and programming would continue throughout the night, featuring Dragon Ball Z, Mobile Suit Gundam Wing, Tenchi Muyo!, Outlaw Star, The Big O season 1, Yu Yu Hakusho, Blue Submarine No. 6, Trigun, the original version of Astro Boy, and Gigantor. T.O.M. also presented a review of Mass Effect 3 and promoted the recent DVD releases of the series featured. Subsequently, on May 16, 2012, Adult Swim announced via Twitter and later by a press release that Toonami would return to Adult Swim on May 26, 2012, as a regular weekly Saturday night programming block.
 In 2013, Adult Swim featured images of cats throughout much of its programming. All of the bumps contained videos and images of cats, while the episodes of the live-action shows aired that night had cat faces covering up the faces of the actors. The [adult swim] logo was replaced with "[meow meow]".
 In 2014, Adult Swim premiered an eighth episode of Perfect Hair Forever, seven years following the series finale. This was followed by an unannounced Space Ghost Coast to Coast marathon featuring creator-chosen episodes (including the full version of "Fire Ant", which has rarely been aired on TV). During the marathon, bumps were included between episodes showing outtakes and commentary from the writers and staff. The prank streamed on a loop on Adult Swim's website the next day.
 In 2015, Adult Swim aired a 6 hour marathon of Aqua Teen Hunger Force, with superimposed coins on the screen, replicating the "Coin Hunt" game from Adult Swim's online live stream show FishCenter. The main characters of the show collected points by hovering over the coins during the episodes, with the points counted and tabulated throughout the night. Master Shake was ultimately declared the winner. FishCenter streamed live during the whole event, featuring special guest Trixie Mattel, Zach White, a guitar music performance from Jared Hill, and several confused call-ins.
 In 2016, advertisements were shown for the April Fools' broadcast, recapping their 12-year history of pranks and hyping up that year's prank. When midnight did occur, regular programming played, with the implication being that the prank for 2016 was that there was no prank.
 On the broadcast night of March 31, 2017, all the regularly scheduled episodes after midnight had a weird audio mix, including added laugh tracks, Seinfeld stings, robotic and pitch-shifted filters added to particular voices, various sound effects and alternate musical pieces.
 On April 1, 2017, the evening portion of Adult Swim was replaced with the unannounced Rick and Morty Season 3 premiere, "The Rickshank Rickdemption". It aired repeatedly from 8:00p.m. until midnight on TV, shortening Toonami in the process, and streamed on a loop on Adult Swim's website. Newly commissioned Rick and Morty idents and announcement promos for upcoming shows and seasons aired during the prank. The episode then repeated every night at 10:00 p.m. until April 7.
 On the broadcast night of March 31, 2018, Toonami aired its anime after midnight in Japanese with English subtitles, breaking the block's policy of only playing dubbed anime. The subbed anime included the stealth premiere of FLCL Alternative, the 2004 film Mind Game, and most of Toonami's scheduled programming for that night. The short Scavengers finished off the block at 5:45 a.m. The block aired special bumpers with T.O.M. and S.A.R.A. and a game review of Nier: Automata, all dubbed to Japanese with English subtitles. The Adult Swim logo was also changed to Japanese (stylized as [アダルトスイム]). The originally scheduled programming affected by the prank aired normally the following week.
 On April 1, 2018, Adult Swim aired an animated parody of Rick and Morty titled "Bushworld Adventures", created by Michael Cusack, at 11:00 p.m., instead of Rick and Morty and Mike Tyson Mysteries. It follows Rick and Morty in Australia going on wild adventures in search to find the green cube that was left at Bendigo. All of Adult Swim's nature-themed bumpers that aired throughout the hour were Australian-themed. The short also streamed on a loop on Adult Swim's website.
 In 2019, Adult Swim aired Gēmusetto Machu Picchu, an anime parody that ran continuously from midnight to 5:45 a.m. It was simulcast both on TV and on Adult Swim's online live stream, with a live Q&A with creator Maxime Simonet airing after the program on the live stream. The special was simulcast on Action in Canada as its second-to-last program ever (with an episode of NTSF:SD:SUV:: airing as the last program at 5:45 a.m.), which rebranded into a new 24/7 Adult Swim network in Canada at 6:00 a.m.
 In 2020, Adult Swim aired "Post's Game", a night of sneak peek programming hosted by Post Malone and friends, playing casual games during the broadcast. The prank started with a tease to a new season of Gēmusetto (which debuted later in the year), only to be interrupted by Malone. New episodes of Primal, Dream Corp LLC, Tigtone, The Shivering Truth, Robot Chicken, Lazor Wulf, 12 oz. Mouse, and Tender Touches aired. The series premieres to YOLO: Crystal Fantasy and JJ Villard's Fairy Tales were also shown, along with the pilot for Smiling Friends, a Rick and Morty short by Studio Deen, and a new trailer for the second half of Rick and Morty season 4. Malone made silent cameos on each show (aside from Primal and Smiling Friends) via green screen. Smiling Friends was quickly uploaded to the website due to popular demand, and got picked up for a full series a year later. FishCenter streamed live during the event on the website, taking calls from viewers.
 In 2021, Adult Swim became "Adult Swim Junior", airing versions of the Rick and Morty episode "Total Rickall" (retitled Rick and Morty Babies) and the Aqua Teen Hunger Force episode "Revenge of the Mooninites" (retitled Aqua Child Hunger Force) overdubbed by children with edited scripts and new intros. Promos aired during the prank featured more Adult Swim series made "kid-friendly".
 In 2022, Pibby and Bun Bun, the main characters from the Come and Learn with Pibby proof-of-concept short, appeared in Adult Swim’s programming and bumpers from midnight to 2:00 a.m., occasionally having characters and the environment be visually corrupted. The prank repeated from 3:00 a.m. to 5:00 a.m., simulcast on Adult Swim in Canada, and was streamed to YouTube. Adult Swim later posted a compilation of all the corruptions done in the night's prank. A Pibby-related song played over the network sign-off at 5:59 a.m. HBO Max added the short, and themed the Adult Swim hub around the prank for the following week.

 Alternate reality games 

Adult Swim began an ARG campaign on August 27, 2017, by airing a cryptic bump "transmission" during a new episode of Rick and Morty. The bump referred viewers to a Twitter account. Players were told that they were trying to rescue a stolen AI named Delilah. Weekly bumps provided puzzles to be solved by viewers with solutions submitted via Twitter. The solutions were then confirmed by both the Twitter account and subsequent bumps. Later in the game, Delilah was forced to self-destruct to prevent a security breach. The Twitter account then rebranded itself as a marketing company and claimed that the entire game was an experiment. Soon after this, a new Twitter account followed all the previous account's existing followers. This new account informed everyone that they were searching for their missing sister named Amelia. The bump transmissions then started referring viewers to this new Twitter account as well as several new Instagram accounts, continuing to provide puzzles that required solving. Some players have used Discord to work together as a team in a dedicated server to solve the puzzles and share theories about the game. The ARG has been consistently broadcasting new messages and puzzles every Sunday since the initial August 2017 broadcast, with only a short hiatus during the 2017 holiday break. On March 25, 2018, it was revealed that Amelia was safe and had been for quite some time. Players learned that Amelia's messages asking for help were actually sent 3 years prior and that their delay in being received was caused by time dilation. This revelation effectively completed the second chapter of the ARG, it also alluded to the next phase which has just started as of June 2018.

 Programming 

Original shows currently in-production and seen on Adult Swim include The Eric Andre Show, Rick and Morty, and Smiling Friends. Adult Swim is best known for its inaugural slate of programming, which were mainly parodies and remakes based on Hanna-Barbera cartoons (including Space Ghost Coast to Coast, Harvey Birdman, Attorney at Law, and Sealab 2021).

Adult Swim also airs syndicated programs from 20th Television (Bob's Burgers, Futurama, King of the Hill), original series produced for sister network TBS (American Dad!), and have acquired and co-produced various anime series. Via Adult Swim, Cartoon Network is one of the few U.S. networks to carry anime, and the only network that airs such programming aimed at young adults and teens rather than children.

Currently, most anime and action-genre programming air on Saturday nights as part of Toonami, a former Cartoon Network programming block that was relaunched by Adult Swim on May 26, 2012, as a "block-within-a-block". Cartoon Network shows that have gained a following among older viewers have also aired on Toonami; in particular, Samurai Jack proved popular enough in reruns to warrant a revival in 2017.

 Merchandise and media offerings 
 Official website 
Adult Swim's official website features full episodes of shows, online streams and podcasts, music streaming, comics, a programming schedule, and a section dedicated to its Toonami programming block.

User accounts could once be made on the site, initially for the site's messaging boards, which launched in May 2003 and shut down in October 2016. By 2018, the only main functionality for user accounts left was for creating profiles and participating in the live stream chatrooms. User accounts were permanently disabled in January 2021, following the removal of the chat function.

A store was available on the site, although initially only through the main Cartoon Network store from 2001 to 2004. The store later spun-off into its own website, the Adult Swim Shop, in 2004, and ran until 2012. Another store, As Seen on Adult Swim, launched in 2013 and only sold a single item at a time until 2017, when a QVC-like show was launched with the same name on the Adult Swim streams. The site later shut down in January 2021, following the end of the series in November.

 Video on demand and online streaming 
In mid-2004, Adult Swim launched a video on demand service on subscription television providers. The service includes several episodes from various Adult Swim original series, syndicated series, and anime licensed for Toonami. The anime series s-CRY-ed initially premiered on demand before debuting on the regular block in May 2005.

Adult Swim introduced online video streaming in 2006, providing a free online video on demand service for recent and older episodes of select programming. Initially, some episodes premiered on the website early, although eventually episodes began appearing 1–3 days after broadcast. This became a week after broadcast in June 2010.

In August 2011, Adult Swim began requiring TV Everywhere authentication for most episodes on the site, greatly reducing the amount of free content. This service was combined with the Adult Swim mobile app in 2014. Around this time, Adult Swim began posting every episode of select series online for free viewing, although some of these were removed in 2015 when Hulu acquired the rights to multiple shows, and once again in 2020 when sibling service HBO Max launched.

Most of Adult Swim's library is available on HBO Max, while select series are available on Hulu and Tubi. As of March 2022, Adult Swim's current programming, excluding Rick and Morty (which is shared with Hulu) and Off the Air, is put on HBO Max the day after new episodes air.

Several Adult Swim shows are also available for purchase on iTunes, Google TV, Amazon, Microsoft Movies & TV, and Vudu.

 Video games 

Adult Swim once had many Flash-based online games available on their website, including Robot Unicorn Attack and Five Minutes to Kill (Yourself), but all of the games were removed in 2020 following the discontinuation of Adobe Flash Player. Starting in 2005, Adult Swim began publishing mobile games, including those based on Adult Swim franchises and original content. In 2011, the division Adult Swim Games was created to publish original indie game content, largely focusing on the hardcore gamer market.

 Music 

Adult Swim has partnerships with several independent music labels, and has co-produced and released compilation albums with Stones Throw Records, Ghostly International, Definitive Jux, and Chocolate Industries through their own label, Williams Street Records. Many of Adult Swim's bumps and packaging make use of instrumental and electronic music. Various music is also often borrowed from artists signed onto a wide array of different labels, including Warp Records and Ninja Tune Records.

 Live events 
Adult Swim has held various live events throughout the years through its Adult Swim Presents division. Adult Swim frequently appears at San Diego Comic Con, often holding sneak previews, games, musical performances, among other things. Since 2018, it has held an annual Adult Swim Festival, with a mix of music, comedy, panels, and more. 2018 and 2019's festivals took place in Los Angeles, and had select performances streamed live on the Adult Swim Streams. Due to the COVID-19 pandemic, 2020 and 2021's festivals were held online, through prerecorded videos and live streams on YouTube. The 2022 festival, known as the Adult Swim Festival Block Party, took place in Philadelphia, with highlight reels and select full performances being streamed to YouTube.

 Podcast 
Adult Swim offered a video podcast on iTunes from March 21 to September 19, 2006. The podcasts featured behind-the-scenes segments of shows and exclusive content; such as an interview with Saved by the Bells Dennis Haskins and a look at Brendon Small and Tommy Blacha's Metalocalypse. The podcast reached number two in iTunes' ranking of most downloaded podcasts.

A new audio-only podcast, called the Adult Swim Podcast, was launched on July 11, 2019, hosted by Matt Harrigan. In regular episodes, Harrigan interviews different Adult Swim contributors, show creators, and actors. Max Simonet was later added as a co-host, with interviews still done solo by Harrigan. The podcast also featured a few spin-offs, such as a companion podcast for season 4 of Rick and Morty, a tournament bracket competition for Adult Swim's original comedies, and a tournament bracket for Toonami programming; most episodes of these spin-offs aired live on the Adult Swim Streams. No new episodes of the Adult Swim Podcast have released since November 2020. Adult Swim also teamed up with Abso Lutely Productions to produce season 2 of the This is Branchburg comedy podcast.

 Live streams and web series 
On September 25, 2013, Adult Swim began simulcasting their channel through the Adult Swim mobile app and website, although TV Everywhere authentication is required. Both the East and West Coast feeds are available.

In late 2014, Adult Swim added several free 24/7 live streams to their website, most of them airing marathons of different shows on a loop. One of the live streams, a feed of the Williams Street office's fish tank, became its own series: FishCenter Live, and led to the creation of the Adult Swim Streams.

The Adult Swim Streams consisted of several online-exclusive originals, usually broadcast live, and featured a chatroom, similar to that of Twitch. Many of the shows also accepted calls from viewers to interact with the hosts or change the course of a program.

Select shows aired daily on the service, these included:
 FishCenter Live: A parody of SportsCenter and the flagship series, consisting of Matt Harrigan, Max Simonet, Dave Bonawits, Andrew Choe, and Christina Loranger narrating over footage of the Williams Street fish tank. Fish scored points through games started by the hosts and games played by callers. Special guests, like musicians and comedians, often performed.
 Stupid Morning Bullshit: A morning (later, evenings) talk show hosted by Sally Skinner, discussing strange news stories and current events.
 Williams Street Swap Shop: A phone-in trading show in the vein of tradio programs hosted by Zachary White and Matt Hutchinson. A spin-off, Traveling Tuesdays, had Zach visit places around Atlanta.
 Bloodfeast: A crossword puzzle solving show hosted by Max Simonet and Dave Bonawits that frequently used surreal content intended to disturb viewers, including animations, poetry, and short films. The show received two animated TV spinoffs, Tender Touches in 2017, followed by Gēmusetto in 2019. A stream spin-off known as Bloodfeast Presents featured musical performances using the same special effects to create unique visuals.
 Desperate Losers: A show hosted by various Adult Swim employees that had them play with scratch-off tickets in an attempt to supplement their incomes. The show alternated between the Williams Street streaming studios in Atlanta, Georgia and a New York City streaming studio, until the New York City studio's closure in early 2020.
Some shows aired weekly or on special occasions, these included:
 Assembly Line Yeah! : An arts-and-crafts show hosted by Jiyoung Lee and Anca Vlasan.
 Last Stream on the Left: A podcast-style show hosted by Ben Kissel, Henry Zebrowski, and Marcus Parks. The hosts discuss dark or disturbing stories, conspiracy theories, and paranormal happenings.
 Digikiss: A live one-on-one video dating show where viewers could ask questions and watch the date unfold.
 Truthpoint: Darkweb Rising: A show hosted by dril and Derek Estevez-Olsen, a parody of InfoWars.
 As Seen on Adult Swim: A show hosted by Nick Gibbons, in the style of a home shopping program, selling Adult Swim merchandise and giving away a rare item as the last item every night to a winner of a contest.
 Development Meeting: A show hosted by development coordinators Walter Newman and Cameron Tang where viewers could pitch programs to Adult Swim. Unfinished sneak peeks to upcoming productions were also shown until 2019. One pitch, Skeleton Landlord, eventually made it on air as a part of Infomercials.
 Toonami Pre-Flight: A show hosted by Jason DeMarco and Gill Austin, where they discussed programming, took fan questions, and showed sneak peeks to upcoming promos and game reviews.
 Block or Charge: A comedy clip show hosted by Rex Chapman and David Helmers, based on Chapman's tweets.
 The Cry of Mann, The Call of Warr, and The Weather: Three series from Wham City, where viewers could call in and either play characters or change the story.
Some of the live stream shows aired edited down versions of their shows on Fridays at 4:00 am, under the collective name Williams Stream.

Several previously recorded web series are also available on demand on the website, including On Cinema at the Cinema and its spin-off Decker, which later became a TV series for Adult Swim. Archived episodes of Adult Swim Streams programming are also available.

Almost all of Adult Swim's then ongoing web series, including the Adult Swim Streams as a whole, were cancelled by November 2020. Adult Swim Smalls, a shorts program produced by Off the Air's Dave Hughes, was the only web series to remain. Some series, like On Cinema, have continued on independently. New web series, including spin-offs of Aqua Teen Hunger Force and Rick and Morty, started releasing in 2022.

Currently, the website features several free live streams consisting of marathons of specific Adult Swim programming, with the mobile and OTT apps including a few more streams. Additionally, there is Channel 5, a live stream consisting of various Tim & Eric productions made for the network, along with original series made for the stream, TimAndEric.com sketches, content made for Jash, and the Super Deluxe series Tim and Eric Nite Live! Some of the marathon streams had chatrooms similar to the live stream, though these were removed along with the live stream chatroom in January 2021.

 Mobile and OTT applications 
Since its premiere in 2001, Adult Swim executives have worked extensively to extend the brand's reach to viewers in venues outside of the normal pay-television services. This includes the launch of the adultswim.com website and the release of apps for various mobile and over-the-top platforms providing access to current and past Adult Swim programming, live marathons, live and pre-recorded original programs and the nightly online simulcast of the Adult Swim broadcast. Currently apps are available in the U.S. only for Amazon Fire TV, Android (including Google Cast on Android TV), Apple TV, iOS, Chromecast, Roku, and Xbox One. Due to licensing agreements certain parts of the apps including access to its live simulcast and most episodes of their shows require the viewer to use their subscription-television provider or OTT-platform username and password to authenticate their right to access such content.

 International 

Adult Swim has been actively expanding its reach across the world since 2005. Localized versions have aired in Australia, Russia, Brazil and the rest of Latin America. Adult Swim is usually not paired with Cartoon Network due to local market conditions or government content restrictions and regulations – such as Ofcom in the United Kingdom. 
In such markets, Adult Swim programming is licensed to other broadcasters instead.

 Africa 
In November 2018, Adult Swim made its African debut in South Africa's MultiChoice's streaming service Showmax featuring shows such as Rick and Morty, Samurai Jack, Robot Chicken and Eagleheart at launch. In June 2019, the brand was temporarily made available on TNT as a programming block.

 Australia and New Zealand 

The Australian and New Zealand version of Adult Swim was broadcast on Cartoon Network until December 31, 2007. Shows aired at that time were Aqua Teen Hunger Force, Sealab 2021, Space Ghost Coast to Coast, Harvey Birdman: Attorney at Law (which also aired on SBS), Tom Goes to the Mayor, Home Movies, The Venture Bros., and before its closure, Squidbillies. The comedy block aired every Friday and Saturday and an action block aired during the week, including mature anime like Cowboy Bebop, InuYasha, Bleach, Air Gear, Black Cat, and Ghost in the Shell.

Presently, original comedies have premiered on The Comedy Channel in Australia.  The block would return on The Comedy Channel in March 2008, with Aqua Teen Hunger Force joining the lineup on July 1. The channel has also aired The Boondocks, but not under the Adult Swim banner. To date, Adult Swim has grown considerably with the block now airing every Saturday from 12 to 2am AEST and 6:30 to 7:30 pm AEST to keep with the late night tradition of the former block.

Adult Swim's programming has been released to Region 4 DVD by Madman Entertainment, including shows that have never been shown in Australia. Madman Entertainment has also released R4 exclusive DVDs not available in the United States, including Volume 2 and 3 of Moral Orel and complete collections of Minoriteam and Assy McGee. The Aqua Teen Hunger Force Colon Movie Film for Theaters has also been quietly released to DVD. 

After moving to The Comedy Channel in January 2008, Adult Swim stopped airing in New Zealand until 2021.

In October 2013, Turner Broadcasting in partnership with MCM Media and Movideo launched an Adult Swim video on demand service.

In June 2016, Channel 9 signed a two-year deal with Turner Broadcasting to air a block of Adult Swim shows on 9Go!. After the deal expired, 9Go! did not renew with Turner Broadcasting, and thus the block was shut down.

In February 2021, TVNZ began airing Adult Swim programming on TVNZ Duke in New Zealand. Shows that are currently airing on the channel, such as Aqua Teen Hunger Force, Birdgirl, Eagleheart, Mr. Pickles, Primal, Robot Chicken, The Eric Andre Show, The Shivering Truth, The Venture Bros., and YOLO: Crystal Fantasy, are available to stream for free on TVNZ+.

As of December 2022, the streaming service Stan has Adult Swim shows such as Aqua Teen Hunger Force, Robot Chicken and Ballmastrz 9009 available for streaming in Australia. Rick and Morty airs on the Foxtel channel Fox8.

 Canada 

Teletoon's English and French-language service previously offered adult-oriented blocks that carried Adult Swim programming and aired similar shows: Teletoon at Night and Télétoon la nuit. On February 2, 2012, then-parent company TELETOON Canada Inc. announced that it would be launching a Canadian version of Adult Swim, sharing channel space with the Canadian version of Cartoon Network as one specialty channel just as its American counterpart does. The block launched on July 4, 2012. From September 2015 – September 2017, all of Adult Swim's original series was aired exclusively on the block.

Meanwhile, YTV has aired anime series that premiered on Adult Swim in its Bionix block. G4's Anime Current block, Razer's (now MTV2) Kamikaze block, the defunct Scream (later Dusk), and Super Channel have also aired various anime titles that were broadcast on Adult Swim. In June 2009, G4 Canada launched Adult Digital Distraction, programming that featured many Adult Swim shows. In late 2011, the block was discontinued due to pressure from the CRTC on account of the channel deviating from its original format (which was to air technology-related programming). The block would be briefly relaunched before being dropped again in 2012.Tim and Eric Awesome Show, Great Job! aired on Bell Media's CTV Comedy Channel (formerly The Comedy Network). In December 2013, sibling network Much began airing Childrens Hospital and, later, its spinoff, Newsreaders. They also aired the short-lived series The Jack and Triumph Show.

In October 2014, Netflix began streaming Mike Tyson Mysteries the day after its U.S. television premiere.

On February 25, 2016, Williams Street launched a Canada-specific subscription video-on-demand service for iOS and Android devices. The app contains the majority of Adult Swim produced content, including programming not seen on Canadian television. New premieres are added soon after their U.S. broadcast, with the exception of new episodes of Robot Chicken and, initially, Rick and Morty, which are added the day after its premiere on the Canadian block. The app was discontinued in November 2018.

On March 4, 2019, Teletoon and YTV's current parent company, Corus Entertainment, announced the launch of a full-time 24/7 Adult Swim network on April 1, 2019, as a rebrand of Action. This marks the first time an international version of Adult Swim was launched as its own television channel. With the channel's launch, the Canadian block, as well as Teletoon at Night, were both discontinued as both channels would now focus exclusively on age-appropriate programming. The Canadian Adult Swim block was dropped on March 3, 2019, and Teletoon at Night closed on March 31, 2019.

 France 

The block was launched on March 4, 2011, and airs nightly from 11p.m. to 6a.m. on Cartoon Network France. It has aired Aqua Teen Hunger Force, Harvey Birdman: Attorney at Law, Metalocalypse, Moral Orel, Robot Chicken and Squidbillies. Like most international Adult Swim blocks, it does not air Fox and action shows. Most of the block's programming is not dubbed and airs with English audio and French subtitles.

In the early 2000s, there was a late-night block called "DZAQC" (pronounced "Désaxé"), which carried the 2001 Adult Swim look, but did not have any adult shows, except for Home Movies and Captain Linger. Case Closed was aired on Cartoon Network and Toonami. DZAQC aired random Cartoon Network shows and old promos in English with French subtitles.

A new Adult Swim block launched in March 2015 on L'Enôrme TV. The block stopped broadcasting in June 2016.

On May 15, 2019, WarnerMedia France announced that an Adult Swim block would launch in July that year, with season 4 of Rick and Morty exclusively airing on it in November. The block launched on July 24, 2019, airing on Toonami between 11 p.m. and 2 a.m. CET. On-demand services are available on French online TV and on-demand provider Molotov TV.

 Germany 
The Adult Swim block was launched on January 28, 2009, on TNT Serie (now known as WarnerTV Serie). In 2016, TNT Glitz became TNT Comedy (now known as WarnerTV Comedy) and took over Adult Swim. Programs on the block include American Dad, Assy McGee, Lucy, The Daughter of the Devil, Metalocalypse, Moral Orel, Robot Chicken, Rick and Morty, Stroker and Hoop, The Brak Show, Venture Bros., Aqua Teen Hunger Force, and The Eric Andre Show.

 Italy 
In Italy, several Adult Swim series such as Aqua Teen Hunger Force, The Venture Bros., Robot Chicken, China, IL, NTSF:SD:SUV:: and Mr. Pickles are available on-demand via TIMvision and, since 2021, on Amazon Prime Video. Rick and Morty and Final Space were also dubbed in Italian for release on Netflix, The Boondocks aired on Comedy Central and MTV, while The Oblongs aired on Italia Teen Television and All Music. On Facebook, Adult Swim Italy has confirmed the possibility of airing on Cartoon Network and Boing. In 2018, Robot Chicken and Rick and Morty were released on DVD and Blu-ray Disc from Eagle Pictures in that country.

 Latin America 
In Latin America, an Adult Swim block aired during the overnight hours on Cartoon Network beginning on October 7, 2005. It was originally carried on the regional version of the channel, when it was pulled off and picked up by I.Sat on November 19, 2007, another Turner Broadcasting System Latin America-owned-and-operated network, due to the fact that it was received with negative reviews from parents.

On December 1, 2010, I.Sat revealed that it was cutting Adult Swim programming due to low ratings, adding: "No matter if we add new shows, it would not work". Adult Swim once had a SAP audio in early 2007.

In 2014, it was announced that Adult Swim would return to Latin America that same year. Adult Swim premiered on the Brazilian feed of TBS on November 3, 2014. Adult Swim relaunched in Latin America on April 3, 2015, on I.Sat, in English with Spanish subtitles, premiering Rick and Morty and many other shows for the first time on the region.

On January 6, 2018, the block began broadcasting throughout Latin America on TBS. Unlike I.Sat, this block was being broadcast in Spanish.

After ceasing broadcasts on I.Sat and TBS, Warner Channel began airing the block on May 2, 2020, for Latin America and Brazil, now showing the [as] logo and new content, such as Final Space and the rest of Aqua Teen Hunger Force and Robot Chicken series.

The block lost the schedule from Monday to Thursday and Saturdays on September 14, airing only on Mondays at midnight, and the following month, it stopped releasing new bumpers. On November 15, Adult Swim dropped out of Warner Channel's programming, being its last broadcast on November 8, 2021.

On June 24, 2021, HBO Max announced a list of some original Adult Swim content that will be available since the platform's launch, including: Rick and Morty, Aqua Teen Hunger Force, Robot Chicken, Primal, Squidbillies, The Shivering Truth, and Your Pretty Face is Going to Hell. Its launch took place on June 29, 2021.

 Russia 
From its relaunch in March 2007 to March 2021, 2X2, a Russian channel specializing in animation, aired Adult Swim's original series. There was a separate Adult Swim block, and also an English-language block, where shows were broadcast in English without dubbing, both now being defunct. Adult Swim–produced shows that have aired include Aqua Teen Hunger Force, Robot Chicken, Moral Orel, Sealab 2021, 12 oz. Mouse, The Venture Bros., The Brak Show, Stroker and Hoop, Tom Goes to the Mayor, Squidbillies, Harvey Birdman, Attorney at Law, Space Ghost Coast to Coast, Frisky Dingo, Perfect Hair Forever, Metalocalypse, Lucy, the Daughter of the Devil, and others. 2×2 also broadcast many of the anime that premiered in the U.S. on Adult Swim, although not on 2×2's Adult Swim's schedule. Some shows including The Boondocks and Rick and Morty also premiered outside Adult Swim's block.

On November 1, 2019, 2x2 announced an addition of the Adult Swim section on its site with library containing selected Adult Swim series broadcast earlier on the channel and also new series, like The Heart, She Holler, Off the Air, The Eric Andre Show, Dream Corp LLC, and Neon Joe, Werewolf Hunter, premiering directly on the site uncut. After the discontinuation of Adult Swim shows on 2x2 in March 2021, the shows were removed from the site. Rick and Morty is available on another streaming service, KinoPoisk, although 2x2 still maintained TV broadcast rights and had the last premiered episode available for a small amount of time after the premiere.

 Spain 
In Spain, Adult Swim was a programming block that aired on Fridays from midnight on the TNT channel, between 2007 and 2012. Despite the fact that the block no longer exists in Spain, several of its original series have their own section on the HBO streaming platform.

In December 2020, Adult Swim returned alongside Toonami as a premium pack of the Orange TV service. In it, there are more than 600 episodes of 19 different series such as Rick and Morty, Metalocalypse, Robot Chicken, among others.

 United Kingdom and Ireland 

In 2002, CNX was launched in the United Kingdom as a spin-off of Cartoon Network. It featured much of the content found on Adult Swim and Toonami, anime shows and adult action films, but closed operations after a year in 2003.

A nightly Adult Swim channel was launched on July 8, 2006, on the now defunct Bravo owned by Virgin Media Television, generally starting at midnight. Shows that were previously a part of the UK's Adult Swim block are Robot Chicken, Aqua Teen Hunger Force, Sealab 2021, The Brak Show, Tom Goes to the Mayor, Space Ghost Coast to Coast, The Venture Bros., Moral Orel, and Metalocalypse, Non-Williams Street shows on the block include Stripperella and Kid Notorious. The first "action" series was the anime Afro Samurai, which aired on May 4, 2007, alongside a new UK animated show Modern Toss. On July 7, 2008, Adult Swim ceased to broadcast on Bravo.

Former Sony Pictures Television channel TruTV started airing Adult Swim shows every night from 11 pm to around 3 am in November and December 2016. It broadcast episodes of Rick and Morty, Robot Chicken, Mr. Pickles and Squidbillies.

The UK Adult Swim website offers free access to full episodes of shows including Squidbillies, Harvey Birdman, Attorney at Law, Tom Goes to the Mayor, Minoriteam, Stroker and Hoop, Moral Orel, 12 oz. Mouse, Perfect Hair Forever, Metalocalypse, and Frisky Dingo. Revolver Entertainment began distributing original Adult Swim series on DVD in the UK and Ireland.

FX aired Robot Chicken, Titan Maximum, Venture Brothers and Metalocalypse. These shows were advertised with [adult swim] branding. They began airing on June 5, 2010, in conjunction with the channel's regular schedule and ended on November 27, 2010. On December 14, 2011, the Robot Chicken: Star Wars trilogy appeared on Syfy at 10 pm. The block began airing on TCM 2 starting on January 4, 2012.

Adult Swim returned to UK and Irish television starting with a new block on the FOX channel on September 4, 2015. This was discontinued in September 2017, and Adult Swim was then not broadcast on television, although Rick and Morty has since moved to Comedy Central and is available to stream on Netflix in the UK and Ireland.

Adult Swim once again returned to the UK with a new block on E4 in February 2019. This block shows Adult Swim shows as well as some other shows being able to stream on All 4 such as Tim and Eric Awesome Show, Great Job!, Rick and Morty, and much more. Rick and Morty reruns also air on E4 Extra.

 High definition channels and service 
A high-definition feed of Adult Swim is available on many subscription-television providers, and is shared with its daytime counterpart Cartoon Network. The high definition feed broadcasts in 1080i high-definition on nearly all providers, and was launched on October 15, 2007, along with Cartoon Network HD. Like all WarnerMedia networks, 4:3-sourced content is stretched on the high definition feed to fill the 16:9 aspect ratio. Exceptions include 4:3-sourced content that has been remastered to high definition, such as Dragon Ball Z Kai, Cowboy Bebop (since 2015), Samurai Jack (since 2018), Home Movies, King of the Hill, and Futurama (all three since 2021), and any recent programming that intentionally uses the 4:3 aspect ratio for its visual style, such as season 1 of The Eric Andre Show and Jack Stauber's OPAL''. Network bumpers and promos were still made in the 4:3 aspect ratio until 2010, and therefore also appeared stretched on the high definition feed. The network's HD content airs with letterboxing on the standard definition channel. As of 2013, many subscription providers carry the high definition feed (along with Cartoon Network HD) and downscale it for the standard definition feed.

References

External links 
 

 
2000s in comedy
2001 establishments in Georgia (U.S. state)
Adult animation studios
Cartoon Network
Cartoon Network programming blocks
Television programming blocks in the United States
Williams Street